Dufaux may refer to:

People
Dufaux (surname)

Other uses
Dufaux automobile, Swiss race car manufacturer, 1904 - 1907.
Dufaux, the Japanese name of Dufort, a character in Zatch Bell!
Dufaux triplane (Dufaux 3), an experimental aircraft constructed by Henri and Armand Dufaux
Dufaux 4, a biplane constructed by Henri and Armand Dufaux
Dufaux 5, a biplane constructed by Henri and Armand Dufaux

See also
 Faux (surname)